Zygaena marcuna is a species of moth in the Zygaenidae family. It is found in Morocco, Algeria and Tunisia. It is dull red or dark pink. The black dot situated in the distal area touches the black costal margin, and the red basal area is separated from the red discal area by a heavy black band. 
It was described from the Aures Mountains from specimens found in May.The larval host plants are Ononis natrix and Ononis repens. Imagines fly in  May and June.

Subspecies
Zygaena marcuna marcuna
Zygaena marcuna ahmarica Reiss, 1944
Zygaena marcuna delicioli Wiegel, 1973
Zygaena marcuna numidia Hofmann, G. Reiss & Tremewan, 1994
Zygaena marcuna tingitana Reiss, 1937
Zygaena marcuna tlemceni Slaby, 1974

References

External links
 Zygenes maroc richesse declin

Moths described in 1888
Zygaena
Moths of Africa